The Microsoft Surface Pro 8 is a 2-in-1 detachable tablet computer developed by Microsoft to supersede the Surface Pro 7. It combines the form factor and exterior design of the Surface Pro X with internal Intel-based hardware of the Pro 7+. It was announced on September 22, 2021 alongside the Surface Go 3, updated Surface Pro X models, a new Surface Laptop Studio, Surface Duo 2, Surface Slim Pen 2, and several other accessories. The tablet is powered by the new Windows 11 operating system.

On 4 Feb, 2022, Microsoft announced the general availability for organisations across industries in the UAE of its Surface Laptop Studio and Surface Pro 8.

Configurations

Hardware 
 The Surface Pro 8 is the 10th addition to the Surface Pro lineup preceded by the Surface Pro 7+ and Surface Pro X.
 An updated design that aligns closer to the previously launched Surface Pro X.
 Intel 11th Gen Core i3, i5, or i7 processors
 13-inch touchscreen at 267 PPI, 3:2 aspect ratio, and 120Hz refresh rate
 Up to 1TB of removable SSD storage
 Up to 32GB of memory
4K video camera support
 Unlike previous Surface Pro models, a microSD card slot is not included.
 The device is the first Surface Pro to include two USB-C ports with Thunderbolt 4.
 Like previous models, the built-in kickstand unfolds from 0 degrees to 165 degrees.
 The 51.5 watt-hour battery offers system runtime of up to 16 hours.

Software 

Surface Pro 8 is powered by the new Windows 11 Home operating system (Windows 11 Pro or Windows 10 Pro for business models) with a 30-day trial of Microsoft 365. The device also supports Windows Hello login using biometric facial recognition.

Timeline

External links

References

Tablet computers introduced in 2021
Microsoft Surface
2-in-1 PCs